Linda Marie McMahon (née Edwards; October 4, 1948) is an American political executive, business executive, and performer. She served as the 25th administrator of the Small Business Administration from 2017 to 2019.

McMahon, along with her husband, Vince McMahon, founded sports entertainment company Titan Sports, Inc. (today WWE) where she worked as the president and later CEO from 1980 to 2009. During this time, the company grew from a small regional business in the northeast to a large multinational corporation. Among other things, she initiated the company's civic programs, Get REAL and Smackdown Your Vote. She gave occasional on-screen performances, most notably in a feud with her husband that culminated at WrestleMania X-Seven.

In 2009, McMahon left the WWE to run for a seat in the United States Senate from Connecticut as a Republican, but lost to Democrat Richard Blumenthal in the 2010 general election. She was the Republican nominee for Connecticut's other Senate seat in the 2012 race, but lost to Democrat Chris Murphy.

On December 7, 2016, Donald Trump (president-elect at the time) announced that he would nominate McMahon to be Administrator of the Small Business Administration. The Senate confirmation hearing began on January 24, 2017, and on February 1, her nomination was approved by the Senate Committee on Small Business and Entrepreneurship with an 18–1 vote and confirmed by the full Senate on February 14, by a vote of 81–19.

On March 29, 2019, the Trump administration announced McMahon would step down as the administrator of the Small Business Administration to assume new responsibilities within President Trump's reelection campaign, and the resignation took effect on April 12. On April 15, she was named chairwoman of America First Action, a pro-Trump Super PAC.

Early life
McMahon was born Linda Marie Edwards in New Bern, North Carolina, the daughter of Evelyn and Henry Edwards. She was an only child and grew up as a "tomboy" playing basketball and baseball. Her parents were both employees at Marine Corps Air Station Cherry Point, a military base. She grew up in a conservative Baptist family, but converted to Roman Catholicism in her later years.

Linda M. Edwards, at the age of 13, met Vince McMahon, then age 16. Her mother worked in the same building as McMahon's mother, but they had not met.

Vince's mother became good friends with the Edwards family, and Vince, who had lived with several abusive stepfathers, enjoyed the feeling of stability that he felt at their home. Edwards and McMahon dated throughout their high school years; she attended Havelock High School and he attended Fishburne Military School in Virginia. During this time, Vince was a "permanent fixture" at her home, and spent hours with Linda and her family. He attended East Carolina University, studying business administration. Edwards was an honors student in high school and aspired to become a pediatrician.

Shortly after her high school graduation, Vince asked her to marry him. They married on August 26, 1966, when she was 17. She enrolled at East Carolina University in 1966, where she obtained a bachelor's degree in French, and certification to teach. From 1968 to 1971, Vince worked as a traveling cup salesman before joining his father's company, the World Wide Wrestling Federation (WWWF, now WWE). Linda finished college in three years so she could graduate with Vince. Their son Shane was born in 1970, followed by daughter Stephanie in 1976.

Early career
In 1969, the McMahons moved to Gaithersburg, Maryland. McMahon worked as a receptionist at the corporate law firm of Covington & Burling; she translated French documents, trained as a paralegal in the probate department, and studied intellectual property rights.

Financially, the couple fared poorly for several years and, despite her husband working 90 hours a week at a quarry, briefly received food stamps. In 1976, after a series of failed business ventures including financing stunt performer Evel Knievel's Snake River Canyon Jump, and while pregnant with Stephanie, McMahon and her husband filed for bankruptcy.

By 1979, Vince decided to start his own wrestling company. He purchased the Cape Cod Coliseum in Massachusetts and founded Titan Sports, Inc. in 1980. The McMahons held small hockey and other sporting events in addition to wrestling at the Cape Cod Coliseum. At one point, Linda cooked meatball sandwiches to feed the fans at these sporting events. As the company grew, Linda assisted Vince with administration and used her knowledge of intellectual property law to assist in trademark protection for the company. During much of those early years, she had little interest in professional wrestling.

In 1982, Vince McMahon purchased Capitol Wrestling, better known as the parent company of the World Wrestling Federation (WWF), from his father. He later expanded his market by airing WWF shows on national television.

In 1983, the McMahons moved to Greenwich, Connecticut. They have six grandchildren.

World Wrestling Federation and entertainment

Corporate

The McMahons founded Titan Sports, Inc. in 1980. Many workers in the company referred to her as the "co-chief executive". McMahon became president in 1993 and CEO of the company in 1997. The company's explosive growth and the way it transformed the wrestling industry caused some observers to label her and Vince "business geniuses".

One of her major interests in WWF and WWE was product merchandising. She negotiated many of the company's business deals with outside vendors and established the company's first line of action figures, Wrestling Superstars, in 1984. It was a first in the wrestling industry and helped expand the company's popularity with children. In more recent years, she was the primary negotiator for the World Wrestling Federation's 2000 TV deal with Viacom.

During an interview with The Detroit News, when asked what it was like being CEO in a "testosterone-charged industry," McMahon replied, "It's lots of fun. I'm an only child, so I grew up as my father's son and mother's daughter. I was quite a jock. I played baseball, basketball—I think that background made Vince and I very compatible. I really have a very good understanding of the male psyche—I'm very comfortable in a guy environment. I have to say that there are very strong women in this company as well. Our human resources division and our consumer goods division are headed by women—It's still a testosterone business, and I like it."

On September 16, 2009, Linda McMahon resigned from her position as CEO of WWE and left WWE to run as a Republican for a seat in the United States Senate from Connecticut. However, she still remains a minority owner of WWE.

McMahon's memorandum to Pat Patterson
In a 1989 memo to the company's vice president, Pat Patterson, McMahon directed Patterson to fire on-call physician George Zahorian and inform him of imminent legal charges charging him with steroid distribution.

This memo became known publicly as the "Tip-Off Memo" during her campaign for Senate in 2010. It became a political liability used against her in both the nomination and general election campaigns.

Federal steroids investigation (2007–2009)

Following the murder-suicide of Chris Benoit in 2007, the Oversight and Government Reform Committee investigated steroid usage in the wrestling industry. The Committee investigated WWE and Total Nonstop Action Wrestling (TNA), asking for documentation of their companies' drug policies. The McMahons both testified. The documents stated that 75 wrestlers—roughly 40 percent—had tested positive for drug use since 2006, most commonly for steroids.

McMahon was asked why there had been no follow-up during a televised interview with CBS Face the State on January 20, 2010 and responded: "There's not been any follow-up from any of the inquiries that were made because I believe we had furnished thousands of documents and testimony for them, and I think if they looked at our policy and really delved into it, they would be very satisfied."

PG rating

In July 2008, WWE changed its TV parental guidelines rating from TV-14 to TV-PG. In December 2008, at a UBS Media Conference, McMahon described the new rating as a marketing strategy to attract a young generation of wrestling fans and create loyalty to the brand. Due to the TV-PG rating, chair shots to the head were banned, as well as sex scenes, blood, and vulgar language.

Company legacy
During the 1980s, the WWF successfully overcame considerable opposition and some media ridicule in lobbying for deregulation in Connecticut, Delaware, Michigan, New Jersey, California, Florida, Pennsylvania, and Texas. By 2000, fewer than half of the 50 states had athletic regulations on the wrestling industry.

Following common practice in professional sports, WWE classifies its wrestlers as independent contractors rather than employees. The classification allowed the company to avoid paying Social Security, Medicare and unemployment insurance for wrestlers. McMahon stated the WWE wrestlers had lucrative contracts, merchandising deals, royalty payments, and appearance fees. She noted that many of the wrestlers had agents and considered them to be on par with "singers, golfers, or tennis players". The company offered seminars to help wrestlers select health insurance plans.

Under McMahon's tenure, WWE became one of the largest recipients of special tax credits for film and TV production granted by the state of Connecticut.

During her 2010 campaign, Blumenthal's campaign criticized her and WWE for accepting the tax credits while laying off workers in 2009.

On-screen roles

McMahon often referred to the creative side of WWE as Vince's specialty, stating that she was primarily in the management team, although she appeared in several storylines. McMahon debuted on WWF TV during the Corporate Ministry storyline, on the May 3, 1999, episode of Raw during the Attitude Era. During an interview with Fox News, she said that she often did not know what the storylines were in advance and watched events unfold as the general public did.

Charitable work
Through WWE, the McMahons were major donors to The Donald J. Trump Foundation, giving $4 million in 2007 and $5 million in 2009. The McMahons donated over $8 million in 2008 to the Fishburne Military School, Sacred Heart University, and East Carolina University. Nonprofit Quarterly noted the majority of the McMahons' donations were towards capital expenditures. In 2006, they paid $2.5 million for construction of a tennis facility in Ebensburg, Pennsylvania. As of 2010, she served on the board of the Close Up Foundation, a nonprofit which offers youth field trips to Washington, D.C.

Get R.E.A.L.
McMahon launched the company's Get R.E.A.L. program to deliver positive messages about education to young adults. The program encouraged literacy through public service announcements, posters, and bookmarks featuring wrestling superstars. In 2000, the American Library Association reported the WWF's Know Your Role poster was its highest-selling poster for two straight months. Since 2006, thousands of posters featuring WWE superstars have been distributed to libraries and reading facilities.

SmackDown! Your Vote campaign
McMahon initiated WWE's non-partisan voter registration campaign, "SmackDown! Your Vote", in August 2000. The campaign targeted the 18-to-30 voter demographic, and made use of online marketing, public service announcements, and youth voting partnerships. The campaign, which registered 150,000 new voters during the 2000 election, was started in coalition with MTV's Choose or Lose, Project Vote Smart, and Youth Vote 2000. As of the 2008 election, it listed 14 voter registration partner organizations. During the 2008 presidential election, Smackdown your Vote! registered many voters online, often in affiliation with Rock the Vote.

Special Olympics
The McMahons began supporting the Special Olympics in 1986. McMahon first developed an interest in the Olympics from her friendship with NBC producer Dick Ebersol and Susan Saint James, who encouraged them to participate in the mid-1980s.

She met Lowell Weicker, whose son is developmentally-disabled, through the Special Olympics. In 1995, as Connecticut Governor, Weicker appointed Linda McMahon to the Governor's Council for the World Special Olympics.

Achievements
McMahon became a member of the board of trustees of Sacred Heart University in Fairfield, Connecticut in November 2004. She supported many organizations, including the USO, the Make-A-Wish Foundation, the Multiple Myeloma Research Foundation, the Starlight Foundation, and Community Mayors. In 2005, she won appointment to The Make-A-Wish Foundation of America National Advisory Council and received the Arthur M. Sackler Award from the Connecticut Grand Opera and Orchestra for WWE's support of its arts education program.

On January 29, 2007, Multichannel News named McMahon to its class of "Wonder Women" for 2007. The award recognized her outstanding contributions to the cable and telecommunications industries. In May 2007, she appeared as the keynote speaker at the Girl Scout Council of Southwestern Connecticut's Women of Achievement Leadership Breakfast. McMahon was a Girl Scout.

Under her leadership, WWE was the recipient of the USO of Metropolitan Washington's first ever "Legacy of Hope" award for its extensive support of U.S. troops and the USO's Operation Care Package program. In 2007, the company received the Secretary of Defense Exceptional Public Service Award for its support of deployed service members in Iraq and Afghanistan. In 2008, the company received the GI Film Festival's Corporate Patriot Award.

On April 13, 2012, Sacred Heart University officially dedicated and opened the Linda E. McMahon Commons Building on its main campus in Fairfield, Connecticut.

Political career

Connecticut Board of Education
McMahon was appointed to the State Board of Education by Governor Jodi Rell in January 2009.

She went through a confirmation process in the Connecticut State Assembly where she was questioned on her record as CEO of WWE. The State Senate approved her nomination by a vote of 34–1 and the House by 96–45 with some opponents expressing concerns that the nature of her WWE activities would send the wrong message. State representative Bruce Morris claimed she lacked "depth of knowledge regarding education". However, state representative John Hetherington said it "would be good to have someone outside the establishment on the board".

On April 1, 2010, McMahon resigned from the State Board of Education, because state law does not allow board members to solicit campaign contributions.

2010 U.S. Senate campaign

On September 16, 2009, McMahon announced her candidacy for U.S. Senator to represent the state of Connecticut. She announced she would spend up to $50 million of her own money to finance her campaign and refused outside donations, the third most ever spent on a senatorial campaign. She ran for the Republican nomination, campaigning on promises of lower taxes, fiscal conservatism, and job creation. She campaigned as socially moderate, and identified herself as pro-choice while also opposing partial-birth abortion and federal funding for abortions. Her mail, radio, television, and Internet advertisements quickly gained name recognition and strong poll numbers over her opponents.

McMahon's spending became a key argument of one of her rivals, former Congressman Rob Simmons, who accused her of "buying the election". McMahon and Simmons engaged in a frequently bitter contest. At the party convention, McMahon received the most support, but Simmons received enough votes to qualify for the ballot for the August 10 primary, although he was not actively campaigning. In late July—two weeks before the primary—Simmons relaunched his campaign by airing ads on TV reminding voters that his name would be on the ballot, participating in debates, and accepting interviews with editorial boards. A third candidate, Peter Schiff, qualified for the ballot by submitting petition signatures. McMahon defeated her opponents and faced Richard Blumenthal in the general election, losing by 11%.

2012 U.S. Senate campaign

Immediately after her loss to Blumenthal, McMahon hinted she would run again for Senate in 2012. McMahon maintained a high profile following the election, running television ads, campaigning for politicians, and making frequent media appearances. When Joe Lieberman announced he would retire from the U.S. Senate, she became the Republican Party favorite for the 2012 election.

On September 20, 2011, in Southington, Connecticut, McMahon officially announced her candidacy. On May 18, 2012, McMahon earned the endorsement of the state Republican Party at the Connecticut State Republican Convention by a delegate vote of 658 to 351 over the next-highest candidate, former congressman Chris Shays. The two were the only candidates to qualify for the primary, which took place on August 14, 2012. McMahon defeated Shays by a three-to-one margin, spending $15.7 million of her money on the campaign. She lost to Democratic U.S. Representative Chris Murphy in the general election, marking her second consecutive defeat.

Political contributions
Following her election defeats, McMahon committed herself to becoming a major Republican fundraiser and donor. She donated to groups such as American Crossroads and Ending Spending Fund, and associated with fellow mega donor Paul Singer.

As the 2016 Republican nomination process began to gear up in early 2015, McMahon, Singer, and Charles R. Schwab were among donors and prospective-candidate representatives who attended a daylong meeting near Jackson, Wyoming, that was hosted by TD Ameritrade founder Joe Ricketts and his son Todd, and featured "several Republican donors who favor[ed] same-sex marriage and immigration reform".

After Donald Trump made an appearance at WrestleMania 23 in 2007, the McMahons donated $5 million to the Donald J. Trump Foundation in addition to the payment for the appearance. In 2016, McMahon donated $6 million to Rebuilding America Now, a Super PAC with the purpose of electing Donald Trump as US president, and in 2015 and 2016 combined, $1.2 million to Future 45, a Super PAC which funded anti-Bernie Sanders advertisements.

Small Business Administration
On December 7, 2016, President-elect Donald Trump announced that he would nominate McMahon to be the administrator of the Small Business Administration (SBA).

With her pending nomination to become administrator of the SBA, examination of McMahon's record in preparation for her facing United States Senate confirmation began. In December she received media attention including from The Wall Street Journal, which noted that "[a]s part of her 2012 campaign, [the nominee's] economic plan called for getting rid of 'outdated/ineffective and duplicative programs,' and expressed support for a 2012 proposal by President Barack Obama to merge the SBA, the Commerce Department's core functions and four other entities into one unit". The merger proposal, which did not proceed far toward approval at the time, would have eliminated the Cabinet-level post to which McMahon was nominated. The Connecticut Post of Bridgeport, Connecticut, examined issues of potential conflicts of interest from remaining WWE stock holdings and other financial assets, as well as of the relationship between WWE and smaller businesses in the wrestling world, with critics and supporters cited. The Hill provided a venue for two industry representatives to specify how they hoped McMahon would reform the agency she'd been tapped to lead.

The Senate confirmation hearing began on January 24, 2017; her nomination was approved by the Senate Committee on Small Business and Entrepreneurship on February 1, 2017, with an 18–1 vote, and confirmed by the full Senate on February 14, 2017, by a vote of 81–19. She was officially sworn in as administrator of the SBA on February 14, 2017.

On June 17, 2017, in an interview with CNBC, McMahon stated in her role as administrator of SBA that she is "[l]earning how to develop business plans, how to grow, how to pitch [one's] business when [one is] trying to get investors, or to move into a different market and those are aspects of SBA that are not as well known", as the main goals of the SBA are capital, counseling, contracts and disaster relief. She also stated that the goals were being challenged, as the agency faced a five percent budget cut and future restructuring. “What we have done is look inside SBA, and what I have found is there are some duplicative programs that we are going to be merging.”

Later in 2017, she visited 68 cities to hear from small business owners and to support the Tax Cuts and Jobs Act of 2017 backed by President Trump. On McMahon's first anniversary as head of the SBA, on January 29, 2018, The Washington Post said the SBA's progress under McMahon had been "so far, so good" and credited her with improving the SBA's offices' emergency call centers in the aftermath of Hurricane Harvey, hiring an additional 3,000 people to work them, and revamping the administration's online presence.

On March 29, 2019, McMahon announced her resignation as administrator of the SBA to join chair America First Action, a pro-Trump Super PAC. The resignation took effect on April 12, 2019.

Campaign finance
America First Action, a pro-Trump Super PAC chaired by McMahon, helped raise $83 million for Trump's reelection campaign in 2020. McMahon also serves as chair of the board for America First Policy Institute, along with Vice Chair Larry Kudlow, former director of the National Economic Council under Trump and Fox Business host.

Electoral history
Primary

Note: Blumenthal also appeared on the line of the Connecticut Working Families Party and received 30,836 votes on it. His Working Families and Democratic votes have been aggregated together on this table.

Note: Murphy also appeared on the line of the Connecticut Working Families Party and received 37,553 votes on it. His Working Families and Democratic votes have been aggregated together on this table.

References

Further reading

External links

 SBA Administrator Linda McMahon
 Campaign contributions at OpenSecrets (2010)
 Campaign contributions at OpenSecrets (2012)
 
 
 East Carolina University Alumni Profile 

|-

|-

|-

|-

1948 births
20th-century American businesspeople
21st-century American businesspeople
20th-century American businesswomen
21st-century American businesswomen
21st-century American politicians
21st-century American women politicians
Administrators of the Small Business Administration
American political fundraisers
American women chief executives
Businesspeople from Greenwich, Connecticut
Candidates in the 2010 United States elections
Candidates in the 2012 United States elections
Catholics from North Carolina
Connecticut Republicans
Connecticut State Board of Education members
Converts to Roman Catholicism from Baptist denominations
East Carolina University alumni
Living people
Politicians from New Bern, North Carolina
Sacred Heart University
Trump administration cabinet members
Women in Connecticut politics
Women sports owners
WWE executives
McMahon family
Women members of the Cabinet of the United States